G98 may refer to:

 Gewehr 98, a German bolt action Mauser rifle
 G98 Hainan Island Ring Expressway, an expressway in the Chinese province of Hainan
 Codename for the GeForce 9 series of GPUs